NHL Repeat Containing Protein 2, or NHLRC2, is a protein encoded by the NHLRC2 gene .

Nomenclature 
NHLRC2 has also been referred to as Novel NHL Repeat Domain Containing Protein and 1200003F01Rik.

Gene 
NHLRC2 is located on the positive strand of chromosome 10, at position 10q25.3. The full gene spans 62,533 base pairs (bp). Eleven exons are transcribe in the protein-coding mRNA. There is a second, less prevalent transcript variant of NHLRC2; this non-coding isoform is 522 bp of retained intron.

Protein

General 
The translated NHLRC2 protein is 726 amino acids long in humans and has a molecular weight of 79,442.59 g/mol. It has been found in the cytosol, mitochondria, and/or peroxisomes of cells in which it is expressed.

NHL-Repeat 
NHLRC2 is a part of the NHL-repeat superfamily of n-bladed beta-propellers. Specifically, NHLRC2 is a 6-bladed beta-propeller. The NHL repeat is found in many eukaryotic and prokaryotic proteins, and is associated with growth factor regulators.

Function 
The function of NHLRC2 is not yet fully understood. Using bioinformatic analysis, a "YVAD" motif was found to be conserved in eukaryotes, bacteria, and archaea. "YVAD" shows up three times alone in the human NHLRC2 protein. This motif is potential involved in inhibiting caspases 1, 2, 3, 4 & 5, thus possibly having anti-apoptotic properties.

Expression

Normal Expression 
According to NCBI GEO microarray expression patterns, as well as UniGene's Expressed Sequence Tag (EST) profiles, NHLRC2 is expressed at low levels throughout most human tissues.

Conditional Expression 
NCBI GEO Profiles detailed several conditions under which NHLRC2 expression is increase in comparison to base expression levels. Many, but not all, conditional cases involved an increase of NHLRC2 expression in various cancer types, including—but not limited to—the following: leukemia, lymphomas, breast & mammary gland cancer, colorectal cancer, Wilms' tumor, and lung cancer.

Homology 
NHLRC2 has no human paralogs. Extensive orthologs were identified, however, using NCBI's BLAST and BLAT programs. A select group of orthologs are detailed in the table below. This is not an exhaustive list of orthologs; rather, it shows the diversity of NHLRC2 orthologs.

Predicted Post-Translational Modification 
PSORT II predicted one possible cleavage site within NHLRC2 in humans: between amino aids 32Q and 33E. PSORT II also predicted two possible vacuolar signaling motifs—KLPK and TLPK—in humans that were also conserved in close orthologs such as vertebrates and amphibians, but not in distant orthologs like insects or plants.

References 

Human proteins